Node is the third studio album by Australian heavy metal band Northlane. It was released on 24 July 2015 through UNFD and Rise. It was produced by Will Putney and recorded at Graphic Nature Audio in Belleville, New Jersey. This is the first album to feature vocalist Marcus Bridge after the departure of Adrian Fitipaldes in 2014. It also marks the group's first slight departure from their heavier metalcore roots and towards a more alternative and experimental sound.

In 2016, a deluxe edition of Node was released, which contains instrumental versions of all songs, two new songs, a version of the song "Aspire" featuring Marcus' vocals, and the single version of the song "Rot".

Release and promotion
The band released two promotional singles, "Ra" and "Leech" respectively. "Ra" was handed out to fans as a free-download gift for supporting the band. "Leech" was released as a promotional single after the band began an interactive puzzle with clips of the song, combining all of the pieces together will create the song in its full length. A previous November 2014 single, "Rot", was re-recorded for the release of Node.

Critical reception

The album received mostly positive reviews, but also mixed reviews from several critics. Distorted Sound scored the album 8 out of 10 and stated: "Node is a phenomenal display of Northlane's ability to restructure and rediscover, a solid album that is recommended for both prog and metalcore fans alike. Bridge has clearly melted into the boiling pot of talent that are Northlane, stepped up to the plate and proven that he has what it takes to join such a well established band." Exclaim! gave it 7 out of 10 and said: "It's a bold new direction for a group with youth on their side that, while potentially divisive, points towards a bright future." Alex Sievers from KillYourStereo gave the album 60 out of 100 and said: "For a lot of punters, Node is easily one of the most anticipated heavy releases of the year [...] yet I feel that Node has been a victim of that very same hype. While it hasn't quite crashed and burned, like say, Watch Dogs or like the new Star Wars movie will [...] it's definitely taken a fair few hits from such expectations. This album really is an awkward transitional stage for what Northlane could become musically and stylistically, and who knows, that may very well be amazing come the next record. But at this current stage in their musical metamorphosis, there’s an inconsistent level of quality and a lacking in real sonic impact. Which is a just goddamn shame." Dom Lawson of Louder Sound gave the album 3.5 out 5, saying: "Node is a strong step in the right direction and a testament to this band's fighting spirit." Wall of Sound rated the album 8.5 out of 10 and said: "All in all, the album is a great representation of how far this band from Sydney has come in the short amount of time they've been together and its a true indication of why the international fans are loving them too."

Track listing

Personnel
Credits for Node adapted from AllMusic.

Northlane
 Marcus Bridge – lead vocals
 Jon Deiley – lead guitar, composition
 Joshua Smith – rhythm guitar, composition
 Alex Milovic – bass
 Nic Pettersen – drums, percussion

Additional personnel
 Will Putney – production, engineering, mixing, mastering
 Randy Leboeuf – engineering 
 Steve Seid – additional audio engineering
 Tom Smith Jr. – editing
 Luke Logemann – A&R, management
 Adam Sylvester, Marco Walzel and Tom Johannessen – booking
 Patrick Galvin – artwork, design

Charts

References

2015 albums
Northlane albums
Distort Entertainment albums
Rise Records albums
UNFD albums
Albums produced by Will Putney
ARIA Award-winning albums